Antilhue is a village in Chile, South America. It is located in the commune of Los Lagos on the shores of Calle-Calle River just east of Valdivia. Two petroleum-fueled power plants, Antilhue I and Antilhue II, with a combined production capacity of 101.3 MW, are located near the village.

Notable people 

 Victorino Antilef, member of the Chilean Constitutional Convention

References 
Populated places in Valdivia Province
Mapuche language